The Sanderson Covered Bridge is a historic covered bridge, which carries Pearl Street over Otter Creek in Brandon, Vermont.  Built about 1840, it is one of Vermont's oldest covered bridges, and is the only remaining 19th century bridge in Brandon.  It was listed on the National Register of Historic Places in 1974.

Description and history
The bridge rests on abutments built out of marble slabs reinforced with concrete. The exterior is finished in vertical board siding, and its portals are framed by crude pilasters. The road deck is wooden, and laminated beams have been attached to the underside of the structure for added strength.

The bridge was built about 1840, and was one of two surviving covered bridges in Brandon when it was listed on the National Register of Historic Places.  The Dean Covered Bridge, Brandon's other 19th-century covered bridge, was destroyed by an arsonist in 1986.

See also
National Register of Historic Places listings in Rutland County, Vermont
List of bridges on the National Register of Historic Places in Vermont
List of Vermont covered bridges

References

Road bridges on the National Register of Historic Places in Vermont
National Register of Historic Places in Rutland County, Vermont
Bridges completed in 1838
Buildings and structures in Brandon, Vermont
Covered bridges in Rutland County, Vermont
Wooden bridges in Vermont
Lattice truss bridges in the United States